Spontaneous fission (SF) is a form of radioactive decay that is found only in very heavy chemical elements. The nuclear binding energy of the elements reaches its maximum at an atomic mass number of about 56 (e.g., iron-56); spontaneous breakdown into smaller nuclei and a few isolated nuclear particles becomes possible at greater atomic mass numbers.

History 
By 1908, physicists understood that alpha decay involved ejection of helium nuclei from a decaying atom. Like cluster decay, alpha decay is not typically categorized as a process of fission.

The first nuclear fission process discovered was fission induced by neutrons. Because cosmic rays produce some neutrons, it was difficult to distinguish between induced and spontaneous events. Cosmic rays can be reliably shielded by a thick layer of rock or water. Spontaneous fission was identified in 1940 by Soviet physicists Georgy Flyorov and Konstantin Petrzhak by their observations of uranium in the Moscow Metro Dinamo station,  underground.

Feasibility

Elemental

Spontaneous fission occurs over practical observation times only for atomic masses of 232 atomic mass units or more. These are nuclei at least as heavy as thorium-232which has a half-life somewhat longer than the age of the universe. Th, U, and U are primordial nuclides and have left evidence of undergoing spontaneous fission in their minerals.

The known elements most susceptible to spontaneous fission are the synthetic high-atomic-number actinides and transactinides with atomic number 100 onward.

For naturally occurring thorium-232, uranium-235, and uranium-238, spontaneous fission does occur rarely, but in the vast majority of the radioactive decay of these atoms, alpha decay or beta decay occurs instead. Hence, the spontaneous fission of these isotopes is usually negligible, except in using the exact branching ratios when finding the radioactivity of a sample of these elements, or in applications that are very sensitive to even minuscule numbers of fission neutrons (such as nuclear weapon design).

Mathematical 
The liquid drop model predicts approximately that spontaneous fission can occur in a time short enough to be observed by present methods when

where Z is the atomic number and A is the mass number (e.g.,  for uranium-235). However, no known radioactive isotope except oganesson-294 reaches a value of 47 (approximately 47.36), as the liquid drop model is not very accurate for the heaviest known nuclei due to strong shell effects.

Spontaneous fission rates 

In practice, Pu invariably contains Pu due to the tendency of Pu to absorb an additional neutron during production. Pu's high rate of spontaneous fission makes it an undesirable contaminant. Weapons-grade plutonium contains no more than 7.0% Pu.

The rarely-used gun-type atomic bomb has a critical insertion time of about one millisecond, and the probability of a fission during this time interval should be small. Therefore, only U is suitable. Almost all nuclear bombs use some kind of implosion method.

Spontaneous fission can occur much faster when a nucleus undergoes superdeformation.

Poisson process 
Spontaneous fission gives much the same result as induced nuclear fission. However, like other forms of radioactive decay, it occurs due to quantum tunneling, without the atom having been struck by a neutron or other particle as in induced nuclear fission. Spontaneous fissions release neutrons as all fissions do, so if a critical mass is present, a spontaneous fission can initiate a self-sustaining chain reaction. Radioisotopes for which spontaneous fission is not negligible can be used as neutron sources. For example, californium-252 (half-life 2.645 years; SF branch ratio 3.1%) can be used for this purpose. The neutrons released can be used to inspect airline luggage for hidden explosives, to gauge the moisture content of soil in highway and building construction, or to measure the moisture of materials stored in silos, for example.

As long as the spontaneous fission gives a negligible reduction of the number of nuclei that can undergo such fission, this process can be approximated closely as a Poisson process. In this situation, for short time intervals the probability of a fission is directly proportional to the length of time.

The spontaneous fission of uranium-238 and uranium-235 leaves trails of damage in the crystal structure of uranium-containing minerals when the fission fragments recoil through them. These trails, or fission tracks, are the foundation of the radiometric dating method called fission track dating.

See also 

 Natural nuclear fission reactor

Notes

External links
  The LIVEChart of Nuclides - IAEA  with filter on spontaneous fission decay

Nuclear physics
Nuclear fission
Neutron sources
Radioactivity